Arhopala is a very large genus of gossamer-winged butterflies (Lycaenidae). They are the type genus of the tribe Arhopalini. In the relatively wide circumscription used here, it contains over 200 species collectively known as oakblues. They occur from Japan throughout temperate to tropical Asia south and east of the Himalayas to Australia and the Solomon Islands of Melanesia. Like many of their relatives, their caterpillars are attended and protected by ants (myrmecophily). Sexual dichromatism is often prominent in adult oakblues.

The genus' delimitation versus Amblypodia and Flos has proven to be problematic; not all issues are resolved and the assignment of species to these genera must be considered somewhat provisional.

Systematics
As circumscribed here, this genus includes many formerly independent genera. Junior synonyms of Arhopala are:
 Acesina Moore, 1884
 Aurea Evans, 1957
 Daranasa Moore, 1884 (lapsus)
 Darasana Moore, 1884
 "Iois" Doherty, 1899 (nomen nudum)
 Narathura Moore, 1879
 Nilasera Moore, 1881
 Panchala Moore, 1882
 Satadra Moore, 1884

The species have been provisionally sorted into groups of presumed closest relatives, but many species remain insufficiently studied even for such a preliminary assessment at present. For example, A. phryxus – the type species used by Jean Baptiste Boisduval when he described Arhopala in 1832 – was established at the same time as and specifically for this genus. It is considered to be a valid species of unclear affiliations, but it is suspected that Boisduval's taxon is a junior synonym of A. thamyras – the namesake of its species group – which had been described as Papilio thamyras by Carl Linnaeus already in 1764.

Molecular phylogenetic studies have only sampled a fraction of the known diversity of oakblues, but as it seems at least some of the groups represent clades that could justifiably be treated as subgenera. It is also to be seen, however, if the genus is monophyletic in the loose sense as used here, or would need to be split up again.

Species
Species are listed alphabetically, while the groups are listed in the presumed phylogenetic sequence:

<div float="left">

centaurus group (subgenus Nilasera if  valid)
 Arhopala acron
 Arhopala adherbal Grose-Smith, 1902
 Arhopala admete (Hewitson, 1863)
 Arhopala aexone (Hewitson, [1863])
 Arhopala alkisthenes Fruhstorfer, 1914
 Arhopala amantes – large oakblue
 Arhopala ander
 Arhopala araxes C. & R.Felder, [1865]
 Arhopala azenia
 Arhopala centaurus – centaur oakblue, dull oakblue
 Arhopala eucolpis
 Arhopala eurisus
 Arhopala kirwinii Bethune-Baker, 1903
 Arhopala leander (Evans, 1957) 
 Arhopala madytus – bright oakblue
 Arhopala meander Boisduval, 1832
 Arhopala micale
 Arhopala philander C. & R.Felder, [1865]
 Arhopala pseudocentaurus (Doubleday, 1847)
 Arhopala sophrosyne
 Arhopala styx
 Arhopala wandaagesias group Arhopala agesias (Hewitson, 1862)
 Arhopala ijanensis Bethune-Baker, 1897 (tentatively placed here)
 Arhopala kinabala Druce, 1895
 Arhopala similis Druce, 1895anthelus group (subgenus Narathura if valid)
 Arhopala achelous (Hewitson, 1862)
 Arhopala antharita Grose-Smith, 1894
 Arhopala anthelus – anthelus bushblue
 Arhopala auxesia
 Arhopala aedias (Hewitson, 1862) (tentatively placed here)
 Arhopala hypomuta (Hewitson, 1862) (tentatively placed here)camdeo group camdeo subgroup Arhopala anarte (Hewitson, 1862) – magnificent oakblue
 Arhopala belphoebe Doherty, 1889
 Arhopala camdana Corbet, 1941
 Arhopala camdeo (Moore, [1858]) – lilac oakblue
 Arhopala dispar Riley & Godfrey, 1921
 Arhopala hayashihisakazui Seki & Treadaway, 2013
 Arhopala hellada Fruhstorfer, 1914
 Arhopala johoreana Corbet, 1941
 Arhopala opalina – opal oakblue
 Arhopala semperi Bethune-Baker, 1896
 Arhopala varro Fruhstorfer, 1914
 myrzala subgroup Arhopala bazaloides – Tamil oakblue
 Arhopala myrzala (Hewitson, 1869)
 Arhopala myrzalina Corbet, 1941oenea group Arhopala allata
 Arhopala allata suffusa – Tytler's rosy oakblue
 Arhopala khamti Doherty, 1891 – Khamti oakblue, Doherty's dull oakblue
 Arhopala oenea (Hewitson, 1869) – Hewitson's oakblueepimuta group Arhopala atosia (Hewitson, [1863])
 Arhopala epimuta (Moore, [1858])
 Arhopala lurida Corbet, 1941amphimuta group amphimuta subgroup Arhopala alica (Evans, 1957)
 Arhopala amphimuta (C. & R.Felder, 1860)
 Arhopala avathina Corbet, 1941
 Arhopala baluensis Bethune-Baker, 1904
 Arhopala dajagaka Bethune-Baker, 1896
 Arhopala delta (Evans, 1957)
 Arhopala inornata (C. & R.Felder, 1860) (tentatively placed here)
 Arhopala kurzi (Distant, 1885)
 Arhopala major (Staudinger, 1889)
 Arhopala moolaiana (Moore, [1879])
 Arhopala norda (Evans, 1957)
 Arhopala sceva Bethune-Baker, 1903
 Arhopala stubbsi Eliot, 1962
 Arhopala zylda Corbet, 1941
 muta subgroup Arhopala moorei Bethune-Baker, 1896
 Arhopala muta (Hewitson, 1862)
 Arhopala tropaea Corbet, 1941
 perimuta subgroup (subgenus Darasana if valid)
 Arhopala antimuta C. & R.Felder, [1865]
 Arhopala metamuta (Hewitson, [1863])
 Arhopala perimuta (Moore, [1858]) – yellow-disk tailless oakblueagesilaus group Arhopala agesilaus (Staudinger, 1889)
 Arhopala avatha de Nicéville, [1896]
 Arhopala democritus (Fabricius, 1793) (tentatively placed here)alitaeus group Arhopala aida de Nicéville, 1889
 Arhopala alitaeus
 Arhopala ariana (Evans, [1925])
 Arhopala arianaga Corbet, 1941
 Arhopala denta (Evans, 1957)
 Arhopala elopura Druce, 1894
 Arhopala havilandi Bethune-Baker, 1896
 Arhopala pseudomuta (Staudinger, 1889)
 Arhopala sintanga Corbet, 1948agrata group Arhopala ace de Nicéville, [1893] – Tytler's oakblue
 Arhopala agrata – de Niceville's oakblue
 Arhopala azinis de Nicéville, [1896]cleander group cleander subgroup Arhopala aruana (Evans, 1957)
 Arhopala ate (Hewitson, 1863)
 Arhopala athada (Staudinger, 1889)
 Arhopala cleander (C.Felder, 1860)
 Arhopala silhetensis – Sylhet oakblue
 Arhopala zambra Swinhoe, [1911]
 alea subgroup Arhopala aenigma Eliot, 1972
 Arhopala agaba – purple-glazed oakblue
 Arhopala alea – rosy oakblue
 Arhopala aroa (Hewitson, [1863])
 Arhopala aurelia (Evans, [1925])
 Arhopala evansi Corbet, 1941
 Arhopala milleri Corbet, 1941
 Arhopala normani Eliot, 1972
 Arhopala phaenops C. & R.Felder, [1865] (including A. detrita)
 Arhopala phanda Corbet, 1941
 Arhopala ralanda Corbet, 1941
 Arhopala selta (Hewitson, 1869)
 Arhopala sublustris Bethune-Baker, 1904
 Arhopala vihara (C. & R. Felder, 1860) (tentatively placed here)eumolphus group Arhopala acta (Evans, 1957)
 Arhopala asma
 Arhopala bazalus – powdered oakblue
 Arhopala chamaeleona Bethune-Baker, 1903
 Arhopala corinda (Hewitson, 1869) (tentatively placed here)
 Arhopala critala
 Arhopala eumolphus – green oakblue
 Arhopala florinda
 Arhopala hellenore Doherty, 1889 – Doherty's green oakblue
 Arhopala horsfieldi
 Arhopala irma Fruhstorfer, 1914
 Arhopala nobilis (Felder, 1860)
 Arhopala overdijkinki Corbet, 1941
 Arhopala pagenstecheri
 Arhopala tameanga Bethune-Baker, 1896
 Arhopala wildeirama group Arhopala arvina (Hewitson, [1863]) – purple-brown tailless oakblue
 Arhopala buddha Bethune-Baker, 1903
 Arhopala paralea – glazed oakblue
 Arhopala rama – dark Himalayan oakblueagelastus group Arhopala agelastus (Hewitson, 1862)
 Arhopala alaconia (Hewitson, 1869)
 Arhopala alesia – pallid oakblue
 Arhopala barami Bethune-Baker, 1903
 Arhopala cardoni Corbet, 1941
 Arhopala epimete (Staudinger, 1889)
 Arhopala labuana Bethune-Baker, 1896
 Arhopala wildeyana Corbet, 1941fulla group Arhopala disparilis
 Arhopala fulla (Hewitson, 1862) – spotless oakblueaurea group (subgenus Aurea if valid)
 Arhopala aurea (Hewitson, 1862)
 Arhopala borneensis Bethune-Baker, 1896
 Arhopala caeca (Hewitson, [1863])
 Arhopala stinga (Evans, 1957)
 Arhopala trogon (Distant, 1884)ganesa group (subgenus Panchala if valid)
 Arhopala ammon – Malayan oakblue
 Arhopala ammonides (Doherty, 1891)
 Arhopala ariel (Doherty, 1891)
 Arhopala elizabethae (Eliot, 1959)
 Arhopala ganesa – tailless bushblue
 Arhopala paraganesa (de Nicéville, 1882) – dusky bushblue
 Arhopala tomokoae (H. Hayashi, 1976)abseus group Arhopala abseus – aberrant oakblue, aberrant bushblue
 Arhopala anella de Nicéville, [1895]thamyras group Arhopala arta
 Arhopala axina
 Arhopala axiothea
 Arhopala doreena
 Arhopala helianthes
 Arhopala thamyras (Linnaeus, 1764)hercules group Arhopala hercules (Hewitson, 1862)
 Arhopala herculina Staudinger, 1888
 Arhopala leo
 Arhopala sophilus
 Arhopala tyrannus

</div>Incertae sedis

 Arhopala aberrans (de Nicéville, [1889]) – pale bushblue
 Arhopala acetes
 Arhopala aeeta de Nicéville, [1893]
 Arhopala alax – silky oakblue
 Arhopala alexandrae Schröder & Treadaway, 1978
 Arhopala anamuta Semper, 1890
 Arhopala annulata (Felder, 1860)
 Arhopala argentea Staudinger, 1888
 Arhopala aronya (Hewitson, 1869)
 Arhopala arsenius (C. & R.Felder, [1865])
 Arhopala asinarus C. & R.Felder, [1865]
 Arhopala asopia (Hewitson, [1869]) – plain tailless oakblue
 Arhopala atrax – dark broken-band oakblue, Indian oakblue (type species of Satadra)
 Arhopala bella Bethune-Baker, 1896
 Arhopala birmana – Burmese bushblue
 Arhopala brooksiana Corbet, 1941
 Arhopala canaraica (Moore, 1884)
 Arhopala comica de Nicéville, 1900 – comic oakblue
 Arhopala curiosa (Evans, 1957)
 Arhopala davaona Semper, 1890
 Arhopala dodonaea – pale Himalayan oakblue
 Arhopala dohertyi Bethune-Baker, 1903
 Arhopala ellisi Evans, 1914 – Ellis's bushblue
 Arhopala eridanus
 Arhopala grandimuta Seki, 1993
 Arhopala halma
 Arhopala halmaheira
 Arhopala hellenoroides Chou & Gu, 1994
 Arhopala hesba (Hewitson, 1869)
 Arhopala hinigugma Takanami, 1985
 Arhopala hylander
 Arhopala ilocana Osada & Hashimoto, 1987
 Arhopala irregularis Bethune-Baker, 1903

 Arhopala japonica – Japanese oakblue
 Arhopala lata (Evans, 1957)
 Arhopala luzonensis Takanami & Ballantine, 1987
 Arhopala matsutaroi (H. Hayashi, 1979)
 Arhopala mindanensis
 Arhopala mizunumai
 Arhopala myrtha (Staudinger, 1889)
 Arhopala nakamotoi
 Arhopala nicevillei Bethune-Baker, 1903
 Arhopala ocrida (Hewitson, 1869)
 Arhopala ormistoni – Ormiston's oakblue
 Arhopala pabihira
 Arhopala paramuta – hooked oakblue
 Arhopala phryxus Boisduval, 1832
 Arhopala pseudovihara (H. Hayashi, 1981)
 Arhopala qiongdaoensis Chou & Gu, 1994
 Arhopala quercoides
 Arhopala rudepoema Seki, [1995]
 Arhopala sakaguchii (H. Hayashi, 1981)
 Arhopala sangira Bethune-Baker, 1897
 Arhopala schroederi
 Arhopala siabra
 Arhopala simoni Schröder & Treadaway, 1999
 Arhopala singla (de Nicéville, 1885) – yellow-disk oakblue
 Arhopala staudingeri Semper, 1890
 Arhopala straatmani
 Arhopala tephlis
 Arhopala theba (Hewitson, [1863])
 Arhopala tindongani Nuyda & Takanami, 1990
 Arhopala trionaea Semper, 1890 (camdeo group?)
 Arhopala weelii
 Arhopala zeta

Footnotes

References

 Brower, Andrew V. Z. (2008): Tree of Life Web Project – Arhopala. Version of 2008-APR-09. Retrieved 2009-MAR-21.
 Savela, Markku (2008): Markku Savela's Lepidoptera and Some Other Life Forms – Arhopala. Version of 2008-AUG-06. Retrieved 2009-MAR-21.
Evans, W H, 1957 A revision of the Arhopala group of Oriental Lycaenidae (Lepidoptera: Rhopalocera) Bulletin of the British Museum (Natural History), London, Entomology Volume 5 : 85- 141 online

External links
Images representing Arhopala  at  Consortium for the Barcode of Life

 
Arhopalini
Lycaenidae genera
Taxa named by Jean Baptiste Boisduval